Maritime Christian College is a degree-issuing institution located in Charlottetown, Prince Edward Island. The college is part of the Church of Christ / Christian Church Restoration Movement. The purpose of Maritime Christian College is to equip students for Christian ministries such as pulpit ministry, Christian education and youth ministry. It also serves to educate and enrich students for personal, active Christian service.

History
Maritime Christian College was established January 19, 1960 when the government of Prince Edward Island granted Letters Patent to the incorporators. This action was initiated by a group of individuals who were intensely interested in the Lord's work in the Canadian Maritimes.

The lack of a trained local gospel ministry had for years led to a dormant or declining situation in the churches in this area. For years, local young men and women went to the United States for Christian training and remained there to serve, leaving behind a void.

Maritime Christian College is located in Charlottetown, the capital of Prince Edward Island. For the first three decades, the college shared facilities with Central Christian Church on Kent Street. In the summer of 1993, the college purchased its own campus at 503 University Avenue, across from the University of Prince Edward Island.  The close proximity to the university allows MCC, PEI's only bible college, access to their facilities which include their library, cafeteria and sports facilities.

From its conception, Maritime Christian College has been affiliated with and supported by the Christian churches and churches of Christ. These churches are a part of the Restoration Movement, which was begun in the 19th century by such men as Alexander Campbell and Barton W. Stone. This movement is based on a plea for unity among God's people by restoring the essential elements of Biblical Christianity. Through the years Maritime Christian College has been providing solid, Biblically-oriented education for Christian leaders who are preparing for a variety of ministry opportunities in the Maritimes and around the world.

See also
 Higher education in Prince Edward Island

References

External links
 

Universities and colleges affiliated with the Christian churches and churches of Christ
Colleges in Prince Edward Island
Education in Charlottetown
Educational institutions established in 1960